Karak may refer to:

Places
 Al-Karak or Kerak, city and Crusader castle in Jordan
 Karak Governorate, Jordan
 al-Karak, Syria, city in Syria's Daraa Governorate
 Karak Nuh, village in the Beqaa Valley, Lebanon
 Karak, Iran (disambiguation)
 Karak, Pahang, town in Malaysia
 Karak Expressway, highway in Malaysia
 Karak, Pakistan, city in Pakistan
 Karak District, district of Khyber Pakhtunkhwa, Pakistan
 Khirbet Kerak (Karak) or Beth Yerah, archaeological site on the Sea of Galilee, Israel

People
 Karak (mascot), mascot in form of Red-tailed Black Cockatoo, 18th Commonwealth Games, Melbourne 2006
 Karak (surname), found in the state of Karnataka, India

History
 Siege of Kerak (1183) conducted by Saladin against the Crusader castle
 Siege of Al-Karak (1834) imposed by Ibrahim Pasha of Egypt on the town
 Gaya confederacy (Gaya is also known as Kaɾak), confederacy in southern Korea (42-562 CE)

Food
 Karak tea (شاي الكرك), an alternate name for Masala chai in the Persian Gulf region, a spiced milk tea beverage popular in Qatar and the United Arab Emirates

See also
 Carrack, a three- or four-masted ocean-going sailing ship
 Korak (disambiguation)